Fernanda Marlowe (born 1942) is a British actress, best known for her role as Corporal Bell in the Doctor Who stories The Mind of Evil (1971) and The Claws of Axos (1971). She also appeared in a Dixon of Dock Green episode The Avenger, in 1965.

References

External links
 

Living people
1942 births
British actresses